Trevor Robinson (born May 16, 1990) is a former American football center who played five seasons in the National Football League (NFL). He played college football at Notre Dame. He was signed by the Cincinnati Bengals as an undrafted free agent in 2012, and was also a member of the San Diego Chargers and Atlanta Falcons.

Early years
He attended Elkhorn High School in Elkhorn, Nebraska. He was selected to play in the U.S. Army All-American Bowl in San Antonio, Texas. He was selected to the 2007 first-team All-American by USA Today.

College career
He played college football at Notre Dame. In his freshman year, he played 11 games in which he started 3 of them. In his sophomore year, he played in 11 games in which he started all 11 of them. In his junior year, he played in 13 games in which started all 13 of them.

Professional career

Cincinnati Bengals
On May 2, 2012, he signed with the Cincinnati Bengals as an undrafted free agent.

San Diego Chargers
On October 6, 2014, the San Diego Chargers claimed him off the Cincinnati Bengals practice squad. The Chargers waived him on July 29, 2016.

Atlanta Falcons
On November 29, 2016, Robinson was signed by the Atlanta Falcons. He was released on December 6, 2016. He signed a futures contract with the Falcons on January 18, 2017.

On July 17, 2017, Robinson retired from the NFL and the Falcons placed him on the team's reserve/retired list. He was released from the list on July 26, 2020.

References

External links
Notre Dame Fighting Irish bio
Cincinnati Bengals bio

1990 births
Living people
People from Kearney, Nebraska
Players of American football from Nebraska
American football centers
American football offensive guards
Notre Dame Fighting Irish football players
Cincinnati Bengals players
San Diego Chargers players
Atlanta Falcons players